Agnieszka Radwańska was the defending champion, but lost to Nadia Petrova in the final, 6–0, 1–6, 6–3.

Seeds
The top eight seeds receive a bye into the second round.

Draw

Finals

Top half

Section 1

Section 2

Bottom half

Section 3

Section 4

Qualifying

Seeds
{{columns-list|colwidth=30em|
  Magdaléna Rybáriková (first round)
  Bojana Jovanovski (qualified)
  Tímea Babos (first round)
  Andrea Hlaváčková (qualifying competition, lucky loser)  Kiki Bertens (withdrew, still competing at Seoul)  Mandy Minella (qualifying competition)  Lourdes Domínguez Lino (first round)  Galina Voskoboeva (qualifying competition)  Laura Robson (withdrew, still competing at Guangzhou)  Heather Watson (qualified)
  Polona Hercog (first round)  Casey Dellacqua (first round)  Sílvia Soler Espinosa (qualified)
  Pauline Parmentier (qualified)
  Alexandra Cadanțu (first round)  Johanna Larsson (qualified)
  CoCo Vandeweghe (first round)''
}}

Qualifiers

Lucky losers
  Andrea Hlaváčková'''

Draw

First qualifier

Second qualifier

Third qualifier

Fourth qualifier

Fifth qualifier

Sixth qualifier

Seventh qualifier

Eighth qualifier

References
 Main Draw
 Qualifying Draw

2012 Singles
2012 WTA Tour
Singles

de:Toray Pan Pacific Open 2012
fr:Open de Tokyo 2012
pl:Toray Pan Pacific Open 2012